Marian or Mareyan in Iran may refer to:
 Marian, Fars
 Marian, Kerman
 Marian, Razavi Khorasan